Nadia Jae is a radio presenter on BBC Radio 1Xtra in the United Kingdom. Having presented Weekend Breakfast for the network since September 2019, she was confirmed as presenter of the station's flagship weekday breakfast show in December 2020. Nadia began presenting weekday breakfast in July 2020 following the departure of the previous presenter Dotty, doing so on a temporary basis. She was then confirmed as the regular presenter on 17 December 2020.

Nadia is the official Love Island Boxpark Host and DJ.

References

External links
The 1Xtra Breakfast Show with Nadia Jae (BBC Radio 1Xtra)
1Xtra's Battle of the Mixes (BBC Radio 1Xtra)
1Xtra's R&B Chill Mix (BBC Radio 1Xtra)

BBC Radio 1Xtra presenters
Living people
Year of birth missing (living people)
English people of Guyanese descent